This Timeline of the British Army 1800–1899 lists the conflicts and wars the British Army were involved in.

French Revolutionary Wars ended 1802
Second Anglo-Maratha War 1802–1805
Napoleonic Wars 1802–1813 
War of 1812 1812-1815
Hundred Days 1815 The return of Napoleon
Anglo-Nepalese War 1813–1816
Third Anglo-Maratha War 1817–1818
5th Frontier War 1818
First Ashanti War 1823–1831
First Anglo-Burmese War 1824–1826
First Anglo-Afghan War 1839–1842
First Opium War 1839–1842
First Anglo Marri War 1840
First Anglo-Sikh War 1845–1846
New Zealand Wars 1845–1872
Second Anglo-Sikh War 1848–1849
Second Anglo-Burmese War 1852–1853
Crimean War 1853–1856
Anglo-Persian War 1856–1857
Second Opium War 1856–1860
Indian Rebellion 1857–1858
Second Ashanti War 1863–1864
Bhutan War 1864–1865
Third Ashanti War 1873–1874
Second Anglo-Afghan War 1878–1880
Anglo-Zulu War 1879 
Second Anglo Marri War 1880
First Boer War 1880–1881
Third Anglo-Burmese War 1885
Mahdist War 1881–1899 
Fourth Ashanti War 1894
Anglo-Zanzibar War 1896 Shortest war in history lasted 38 minutes 
Six-Day War 1899
Boxer Rebellion 1899–1901
Second Boer War 1899–1902

See also
Timeline of the British Army
Timeline of the British Army 1700–1799
Timeline of the British Army 1900–1999
Timeline of the British Army since 2000

19th-century conflicts
Wars involving the United Kingdom
19th-century history of the British Army
British Army 1800-1899